Hsu Tzu-yi (born 24 November 1979) is a Taiwanese professional archer representing Chinese Taipei. He competed in Archery at the 2006 Asian Games and won a silver medal with the men's team consisting of himself, Chen Szu-yuan, Kuo Cheng-wei, and Wang Cheng-pang.

References

Living people
1979 births
Taiwanese male archers
Place of birth missing (living people)
Asian Games medalists in archery
Archers at the 2006 Asian Games
Asian Games silver medalists for Chinese Taipei
Medalists at the 2006 Asian Games
21st-century Taiwanese people